Uichang-gu is a district in the City of Changwon, South Korea.

See also
 Changwon
 Seongsan-gu
 Masanhoewon-gu
 Masanhappo-gu
 Jinhae-gu

References

External links 

Districts of Changwon